The Penarth Group is a Rhaetian age (Triassic) lithostratigraphic group (a sequence of rock strata) which is widespread in Britain. It is named from the seaside town of Penarth near Cardiff in south Wales where strata of this age are exposed in coastal cliffs southwards to Lavernock Point. This sequence of rocks was previously known as the Rhaetic or Rhaetic Beds.

Stratigraphy
It includes the Lilstock Formation and the underlying Westbury Formation. The Langport and Cotham Members, grey limestones of marine origin with associated mudstones, are recognised within the Lilstock Formation, itself named from Lilstock in west Somerset. The Westbury Formation is named from Westbury-on-Severn in Gloucestershire.

Ireland
In 1999, the discovery of an ichthyosaur from Langport Member mudstones exposed at Waterloo Bay, Larne provided the most complete example of this in Northern Ireland.

References

Geological groups of the United Kingdom
Triassic System of Europe
Geologic formations of England
Geology of Wales
Geology of Northern Ireland
Geologic groups of Europe
Geologic formations of Ireland
Rhaetian Stage